Jamie Murray and Bruno Soares were defending champions, but chose not to defend their title.

Philipp Petzschner and Tim Pütz won the title, defeating Robert Lindstedt and Marcin Matkowski in the final, 7–6(7–5), 6–3.

Seeds

Draw

Draw

References

External links
 Main Draw

MercedesCup - Doubles
Doubles 2018